Molde FK is a Norwegian professional football club based in Molde, Møre og Romsdal. The club was founded as International in 1911. The club changed its name to Molde Fotballklubb in 1915. The team has participated in 20 seasons of Union of European Football Associations (UEFA) club competitions, including 5 seasons entering the Champions League (1 group stage), 12 seasons entering the UEFA Cup and Europa League (3 group stages), 2 seasons entering the Europa Conference League (1 group stage) and one season in the Cup Winners' Cup. Their first European game was the 1975–76 UEFA Cup 1st Round against Swedish side Öster on 17 September 1975. In 1999 Molde became the second Norwegian club to enter the UEFA Champions League. The club's best performance in the UEFA Cup or Europa League is reaching the Round of 16 of the 2020–21 Europa League.

The club plays its home matches at Aker Stadion, an all-seater stadium in Molde. Molde's record attendance in a European match of 10,705 dates from the 1999–2000 UEFA Champions League match against Real Madrid on 3 November 1999. Molde's biggest win is 7–1 against Knattspyrnufélag Reykjavíkur in the 2018–19 UEFA Europa League qualification, while the biggest defeat is 0–6 against Öster in the 1975–76 UEFA Cup. With 66 appearances including qualifying games, Daniel Berg Hestad has appeared in the most UEFA matches for Molde. Molde has played against Stuttgart four times, more than any other team. Molde has played against Spanish clubs ten times, more than any other nation.

Matches
The following is a complete list of matches played by Molde in UEFA tournaments. It includes the season, tournament, the stage, the opponent club and its country and the score, with Molde's score noted first. It is up to date as of 3 November 2022.

Key

 a.e.t. = Match determined after extra time
 (a) = Match determined by away goals rule
 R32 = Round of 32
 Group = Group stage
 PO = Play-off round
 1R = 1st Round
 2R = 2nd Round

 QR = Qualification round
 1Q = First qualification round
 2Q = Second qualification round
 3Q = Third qualification round

Source:

Overall record

By competition
The following is a list of the all-time statistics from Molde's games in the three UEFA tournaments the club has participated in, as well as the overall total. The list contains the tournament, the number of games played (Pld), won (W), drawn (D) and lost (L). The number of goals scored (GF), goals against (GA), goal difference (GD) and the percentage of matches won (Win%). The statistics include qualification matches and is up to date as of 3 November 2022.

By country

References

Europe
Norwegian football clubs in international competitions